Ash Bank is a small village in Stoke-on-Trent near to Werrington. Located in the village is Ash Hall, an 1830s mansion built by Broad Street Pottery Works Owner, Job Meigh. A large two-storey house in Tudor style, it is a Grade II listed building, as is the single storey lodge which accompanies it. It is now used as a nursing home for the elderly.

References

Villages in Staffordshire